Suwałki railway station is a railway station in Suwałki, Poland. As of 2012, it is served by Przewozy Regionalne (local services) and international trains to and from Lithuania.

References
Suwałki railway station at kolej.one.pl

External links

Railway stations in Poland opened in 1899
Railway stations in Podlaskie Voivodeship
Railway station
Buildings and structures in Podlaskie Voivodeship